The Aérostructure Lutin 80, earlier known as the PLM 80 (planeur léger motorisé), is a small, single seat motor glider with a low power pusher configuration engine, designed and built in France in the 1980s. Only two were completed.

Design and development

The Lutin 80 is constructed from glassfibre/epoxy laminates. It is a mid wing monoplane with straight tapered, square tipped wings, set with 4° of forward sweep at 40% chord and 2° of dihedral. There are upper surface airbrakes near mid chord, inboard of the ailerons. The Lutin has a pod and boom style fuselage with a low set boom aft of the wings and a conventional sailplane forward section with a long, one piece, starboard hinged canopy over the single reclined seat. This pod ends abruptly near the wing trailing edge in a cowling over the three cylinder two stroke JPX PAL 640 engine, which delivers 28.5 kW (38 hp) to a foldable three-bladed propeller mounted in pusher configuration.

The slender, constant diameter boom rear fuselage carries a straight tapered empennage of T-tail configuration with a conventional tailplane and elevator. The Lutin has a mechanically retractable monowheel undercarriage, equipped with a disk brake and assisted by small under wing, cantilever strut mounted balancing wheels at about one third span and a semi-recessed tailwheel.

The Lutin 80 flew for the first time on 3 May 1983 and development continued into 1984. A second aircraft was built but there was no further production. In 1994 both completed Lutin 80s were donated to the Conservatoire de l'Air et de L'Éspace d'Aquitaine (C.A.E.A.) where they remain in 2010, though not on general display. The first prototype was registered as F-WAQM but is now deregistered; the second was never registered.

Specifications

References

External links
Wortmann FX-66S-196 airfoil

1980s French ultralight aircraft